Chechen War may refer to:

 Chechen–Russian conflict, 1785–2017
 Caucasian War, 1817–1864 
 Murid War, 1829–1859, a.k.a. Russian Conquest of Chechnya and Dagestan
 1940–44 insurgency in Chechnya
 First Chechen War, December 1994–August 1996
 Second Chechen War, 1999–2009
 Insurgency in the North Caucasus, 2009–2017